Zbigniew Girzyński (born 17 March 1973 in Sierpc) is a Polish politician. He was elected to the Sejm on 25 September 2005, getting 8734 votes in 5 Toruń district as a candidate from the Law and Justice list.

In 2022, he left the Law and Justice party and formed a new party called The Future Is Coming 5.0.

See also
Members of Polish Sejm 2005-2007

References

External links
Zbigniew Girzyński - parliamentary page - includes declarations of interest, voting record, and transcripts of speeches.

1973 births
Living people
People from Sierpc
Members of the Polish Sejm 2005–2007
Law and Justice politicians
Movement for Reconstruction of Poland politicians
Members of the Polish Sejm 2007–2011
Members of the Polish Sejm 2011–2015
Members of the Polish Sejm 2019–2023